Germaine Guérin was a brothel owner and a French resistance sympathizer during the Vichy regime. She was part of Virginia Hall's spy network that operated in Lyons, France. Along with the gynecologist Jean Rousset, she helped Hall save Jews, Allied pilots, spies, radio operators, and refugees during the Second World War.

Biography 
Little is known about Guérin's life and background except for accounts chronicling her life as a "madam", an owner of a popular brothel in Lyons. She was described as a brunette who wrapped herself in jewels, silks, and furs. She lived in an apartment above her business, which was located in a backstreet of the city, an area now occupied by the offices of the National Treasury of France.

French Resistance 
When Virginia Hall was assigned in France to establish resistance networks, she was given a list of names she can contact by the Allied pilot, Flight Lieutenant Simpson. Guérin was on the list and the two women first met at the former's salon in the winter of 1942. Her brothel was popular among German soldiers, placing her in a strategic position to extract information through the prostitutes she employed. Guérin also helped undermine the Nazis by spreading sexually transmitted diseases among her German patrons. She used forged white cards that authorities used in their drive to prevent the spread of sexually transmitted diseases. With the help of Rousset, a gynecologist, she was able to manipulate this identification document so that infected girls were presented as disease-free.

Guérin was 37 years old when she became Virginia Hall's agent. Prior to her recruitment into Hall's spy network, however, she was already part of the French resistance movement and she was known for harboring Jews forced into hiding. After Hall fled France, Guérin continued helping resistance fighters, providing them food and shelter. She was later arrested after she was betrayed by the Father Robert Alesch, a French Nazi collaborator who posed as Rousset's associate. It was also Guérin who introduced several of Hall's colleagues to Alesch leading to their arrests. These included Monsieur Genet and two collaborators who Hall identified in her correspondences as the "Siamese twins".

References 

French Resistance
French Resistance members
French Resistance networks and movements
Year of birth missing
Year of death missing